Ibrahim Mahama Atiku (born 20 May 1986) is a Ghanaian footballer who is currently a free agent after ending his contract with English club Swindon Town by mutual consent.

Career
Atiku was a member of a Ghana U17 squad that also featured Michael Essien, and after their performances at the 1999 FIFA U-17 World Championship, they went on trial with English club Manchester United in April 2000. Both players were offered contracts by the club, but they were unable to obtain work permits, and the move fell through.

Atiku ended up joining Liberty Professionals in 2000, and in 2001 he made his first transfer away from Ghana as he was taken on loan by Israeli club Hapoel Petah Tikva. until the end of that season and played one game in the UEFA Intertoto Cup with Hakoah Amidar Ramat Gan. His loan ended and returned to Liberty, but his performances had already attracted Swedish club Västerås which signed him in 2003. His next move was to Friska Viljor in 2005, and later played with Assyriska for first time in his career to Allsvenskan League, where he had two full seasons with 48 caps and was considered a key-member of the squad. In April 2007, Atiku decided to separate parts and signed a six-month loan deal with rivals Assyriska at Superettan club IF Sylvia.

It was reported that Botev Plovdiv were interested in signing him and that Cypriot club APEP had offered him a three-year deal contract that he refused in order to take a chance with Scottish Premier League side Inverness Caledonian Thistle. However, this move fell through and finally on 7 January 2009, Atiku joined Vasalund on a two-year contract.

Searching for a way to leave Sweden after many years of services, it was then that Greek historical club Ethnikos Piraeus signed Atiku on a two-year deal in order to help them win promotion to Superleague Greece and went very close on this but financial problems bankrupted the club at the end of the season. Greek courts decided Ethnikos should pay €28,000 to Atiku due to his contract regulations but this decision failed to come through as the club went from professional to amateur and all its debts were erased.

On 11 July 2011, Atiku joined English club Swindon Town on a two-year contract following full preseason and played in all friendly games before the league season started. Following his move, Atiku was given the number 16 shirt for the club and appeared only in the reserve team. On 28 October and after he refused to join Newport Country on loan Swindon cancelled his contract at The County Ground by mutual consent after failing to break into the first team, with Atiku making a statement that he has no regrets after his Swindon exit.

International career
In 1999, Atiku represented the Ghana under-17 team at 1999 FIFA U-17 World Championship in New Zealand and later was part of the Ghana under-20 side at the 2001 FIFA World Youth Championship in Argentina. In 2010, Atiku participated in training with the Ghana senior team but eventually was not invited to play any official games. He was later called up to the squad to play Nigeria in August 2011, but the match was called off due to the rioting in England.

Personal life
Atiku has held a Swedish passport since 13 May 2009.

References

External links

Ghana U-17 Squad
Move to Vasteras
IF Sylvia loan
Vasalund move
Signs for Ethnikos Piraeus
Paolo Di Canio offers him Swindon contract

1983 births
Living people
Ghanaian footballers
Ghana international footballers
Hapoel Petah Tikva F.C. players
Hakoah Maccabi Amidar Ramat Gan F.C. players
Västerås SK Fotboll players
Assyriska FF players
IF Sylvia players
Vasalunds IF players
Ethnikos Piraeus F.C. players
Swindon Town F.C. players
Allsvenskan players
Superettan players
Ghanaian expatriate footballers
Expatriate footballers in Israel
Ghanaian expatriate sportspeople in Israel
Expatriate footballers in Sweden
Ghanaian expatriate sportspeople in Sweden
Expatriate footballers in Greece
Ghanaian expatriate sportspeople in Greece
Olympic footballers of Ghana
Footballers at the 2004 Summer Olympics
Liberty Professionals F.C. players
Association football midfielders